Mary C. Ruggie (née Zacharuk; born 1945) is an American sociologist and professor at Harvard Kennedy School. 

Ruggie completed a B.A. in sociology (1970), M.A. in education (1971) and Ph.D. in sociology (1980) at University of California, Berkeley. Her doctoral advisor was Philip Selznick. 

Ruggie worked at Barnard College, University of California, San Diego, Columbia University, and the Harvard Kennedy School. She teaches courses on social theory, gender, comparative welfare states, health care, and health policy. 

Ruggie met her husband, John Ruggie, in high school. They have a son.

Selected works

References 

Living people
1945 births
Place of birth missing (living people)
American women sociologists
Harvard Kennedy School faculty
University of California, Berkeley alumni
20th-century American women scientists
21st-century American women scientists
20th-century social scientists
21st-century social scientists